The 1998 Chrono des Herbiers was the 17th edition of the Chrono des Nations cycle race and was held on 18 October 1998. The race started and finished in Les Herbiers. The race was won by Serhiy Honchar.

General classification

References

1998
1998 in road cycling
1998 in French sport